Binary compounds of silicon are binary chemical compounds containing silicon and one other chemical element. Technically the term silicide is reserved for any compounds containing silicon bonded to a more electropositive element. Binary silicon compounds can be grouped into several classes.  Saltlike silicides are formed with the electropositive s-block metals. Covalent silicides and silicon compounds occur with hydrogen and the elements in groups 10 to 17.

Transition metals form metallic silicides, with the exceptions of silver, gold and the group 12 elements. The general composition is MnSi or MSin with n ranging from 1 to 6 and M standing for metal. Examples are M5Si,  M3Si (Cu, V, Cr, Mo, Mn, Fe, Pt, U), M2Si (Zr, Hf, Ta, Ir, Ru, Rh, Co, Ni, Ce), M3Si2 (Hf, Th, U), MSi (Ti, Zr, Hf, Fe, Ce, Th, Pu) and MSi2 (Ti, V, Nb, Ta, Cr, Mo, W, Re).

The Kopp–Neumann law applies as:

Cp(M,Si,) = xCp(M) + yCp(Si)

As a general rule, nonstochiometry implies instability. These intermetallics are in general resistant to hydrolysis, brittle,  and melt at a lower temperature than the corresponding carbides or borides. They are electrical conductors.  However, some, such as CrSi2, Mg2Si, β-FeSi2 and  MnSi1.7, are semiconductors. Since degenerate semiconductors exhibit some metallic properties, such as luster and electrical conductivity which decreases with temperature, some silicides classified as metals may be semiconductors.

Group 1
Silicides of group 1 elements are saltlike silicides, except for silane (SiH4) whose bonds to hydrogen are covalent. Higher silane homologues are disilane and trisilane. Polysilicon hydride is a two-dimensional polymer network.

Many cluster compounds of lithium silicides are known, such as Li13Si4, Li22Si5, Li7Si3 and Li12Si7. Li4.4Si is prepared from silicon and lithium metal in high-energy Ball mill process. Potential uses include electrodes in lithium batteries.  Li12Si7 has a Zintl phase with planar Si56− rings. Li NMR spectroscopy suggests these rings are aromatic.

Other group 1 elements also form clusters: sodium silicide can be represented by NaSi, NaSi2 and Na11Si36 and potassium silicide by K8Si46. Group 1 silicides are in general high melting, metallic grey, with moderate to poor electrical conductance and prepared by heating the elements. Superconducting properties have been reported for  Ba8Si46. Several silicon Zintl ions are known with group 1 counterions.

Group 2
Silicides of group 2 elements are also saltlike silicides except for beryllium whose phase diagram with silicon is a simple eutectic (1085 °C @ 60% by weight silicon). Again there is variation in composition: magnesium silicide is represented by Mg2Si, calcium silicide can be represented by Ca2Si, CaSi, CaSi2, Ca5Si3 and by Ca14Si19, strontium silicide can be represented by  Sr2Si, SrSi2 and Sr5Si3 and barium silicide can be represented by  Ba2Si, BaSi2, Ba5Si3 and Ba3Si4. Mg2Si, and its solid solutions with Mg2Ge and Mg2Sn, are good thermoelectric materials and their figure of merit values are comparable with those of established materials.

Transition and inner transition metals
The transition metals form a wide range of silicon intermetallics with at least one binary crystalline phase. Some exceptions exist. Gold forms a eutectic at 363 °C with 2.3% silicon by weight (18% atom percent) without mutual solubility in the solid state. Silver forms another eutectic at 835 °C with 11% silicon by weight, again with negligible mutual solid state solubility. In group 12 all elements form a eutectic close to the metal melting point without mutual solid-state solubility: zinc at 419 °C and > 99 atom percent zinc and cadmium at 320 °C (< 99% Cd).

Commercially relevant intermetallics are group 6 molybdenum disilicide, a commercial ceramic mostly used as an heating element. Tungsten disilicide is also a commercially available ceramic with uses in microelectronics. Platinum silicide is a semiconductor material. Ferrosilicon is an iron alloy that also contains some calcium and aluminium.

MnSi, known as brownleeite, can be found in outer space. Several Mn silicides form a Nowotny phase. Nanowires based on silicon and manganese can be synthesised from Mn(CO)5SiCl3 forming nanowires based on Mn19Si33. or grown on a silicon surface MnSi1.73 was investigated as thermoelectric material and as an optoelectronic thin film. Single-crystal MnSi1.73 can form from a tin-lead melt

In the frontiers of technological research, iron disilicide is becoming more and more relevant to optoelectronics, specially in its crystalline form β-FeSi2. They are used as thin films or as nanoparticles, obtained by means of epitaxial growth on a silicon substrate.

Group 13
In group 13 boron (a metalloid) forms several binary crystalline silicon boride compounds:  SiB3, SiB6, SiBn. With aluminium, a post-transition metal, a eutectic is formed (577 °C @ 12.2 atom % Al) with maximum solubility of silicon in solid aluminium of 1.5%. Commercially relevant aluminium alloys containing silicon have at least element added. Gallium, also a  post-transition metal, forms a eutectic at 29 °C with 99.99% Ga without mutual solid-state solubility; indium and thallium behave similarly.

Group 14
Silicon carbide (SiC) is widely used as a ceramic or example in car brakes and bulletproof vests. It is also used in semiconductor electronics. It is manufactured from silicon dioxide and carbon in an Acheson furnace between 1600 and 2500 °C. There are 250 known crystalline forms with alpha silicon carbide the most common. Silicon itself is an important semiconductor material used in microchips. It is produced commercially from silica and carbon at 1900 °C and crystallizes in a diamond cubic crystal structure. Germanium silicide forms a solid solution and is again a commercially used semiconductor material. The tin–silicon phase diagram is a eutectic and the lead–silicon phase diagram shows a monotectic transition and a small eutectic transition but no solid solubility.

Group 15
Silicon nitride (Si3N4) is a ceramic with many commercial high-temperature applications such as engine parts. It can be synthesized from the elements at temperatures between 1300 and 1400 °C. Three different crystallographic forms exist.  Other binary silicon nitrogen compounds have been proposed (SiN, Si2N3, Si3N) and other SiN compounds have been investigated at cryogenic temperatures (SiN2, Si(N2)2, SiNNSi). Silicon tetraazide is an unstable compound that easily detonates.

The phase diagram with phosphorus shows SiP and SiP2. A reported silicon phosphide  is Si12P5 (no practical applications), formed by annealing an amorphous Si-P alloy.

The arsenic–silicon phase diagram  measured at 40 Bar has two phases: SiAs and SiAs2. The antimony–silicon system comprises a single eutectic close to the melting point of Sb. The bismuth system is a monotectic.

Group 16
In group 16 silicon dioxide is a very common compound that widely occurs as sand or quartz. SiO2 is tetrahedral with each silicon atom surrounded by 4 oxygen atoms. Numerous crystalline forms exist with the tetrahedra linked to form a polymeric chain. Examples are tridymite and cristobalite. A less common oxide is silicon monoxide that can be found in outer space. Unconfirmed reports exist for nonequilibrium Si2O, Si3O2, Si3O4, Si2O3 and Si3O5. Silicon sulfide is also a chain compound. Cyclic SiS2 has been reported to exist in the gas phase. The phase diagram of silicon with selenium has two phases: SiSe2 and SiSe. Tellurium silicide is a semiconductor with formula TeSi2 or Te2Si3.

Group 17
Binary silicon compounds in group 17 are stable compounds ranging from gaseous  silicon fluoride (SiF4) to the liquids silicon chloride (SiCl4 and silicon bromide SiBr4) to the solid silicon iodide (SiI4). The molecular geometry in these compounds is tetrahedral and the bonding mode covalent. Other known stable fluorides in this group are Si2F6, Si3F8 (liquid) and polymeric solids  known as polysilicon fluorides (SiF2)x and (SiF)x. The other halides form similar binary silicon compounds.

The periodic table of the binary silicon compounds

References

Binary compounds
Silicon compounds
Silicon, binary compounds